Michael or Mike Lerner may refer to:

Michael Lerner (actor) (born 1941), American actor
Michael Lerner (angler) (1890–1978), American angler and businessman
Michael Lerner (rabbi) (born 1943), social activist
Michael Benjamin Lerner (born 1986), musician
Michael Alan Lerner, French-American screenwriter, director, and journalist
Michael R. Lerner, dermatologist
I. Michael Lerner (1910–1977), geneticist and evolutionary biologist
Mike Lerner (musician) (born 1981), American metal guitarist
Mike Lerner (filmmaker), documentary film maker

See also 
Michael Learned (born 1939), American actress